This article displays the qualifying draw of the 2011 Bank of the West Classic.

Players

Seeds

Qualifiers

Qualifying draw

First qualifier

Second qualifier

Third qualifier

Fourth qualifier

References
 Qualifying Draw

2011 - qualifying
Bank of the West Classic - qualifying